"That's Not My Name" is the debut single of British musical duo the Ting Tings. The song was originally released as a double A-side with "Great DJ" by independent record label Switchflicker Records on 28 May 2007. After heavy promotion from BBC Radio 1 and the NME, the single was re-released individually on 12 May 2008 on Columbia Records. It was later included on their first studio album, We Started Nothing (2008).

Following the Columbia re-release, "That's Not My Name" debuted atop the UK Singles Chart, seeing off competition from well-established acts like Rihanna, Madonna, and will.i.am. The song was a sleeper hit in North America, peaking within the top 40 of the charts in the United States in August 2009. The single has sold over a million digital copies.

Composition
"That's Not My Name" is written in the key of E major with a tempo of 145 beats per minute. The vocals in the song span from G3 to G5. Vocalist Katie White stated that the song was written "with me ranting about my frustrations with the record industry."

Music videos
The song has three music videos. The first features the Ting Tings on a white background performing the song on a set, with alternating scenes of White with blue and pink backgrounds. This version of the video was used to promote the song and album upon its 2007 release. This video is visually similar to the video for Toni Basil's "Mickey", in keeping with the audio similarities. This video was directed by Sophie Muller and Stacey Hartly. 

Columbia produced a 2008 video for the US release, with director David Allain and with them performing again on a different set, with more equipment and flashing lights in the background. The video premiered on mtvU.com on 26 January 2009. Another video was made for the acoustic version. All videos are live action. The third music video, known as the alternate video, was directed by AlexandLiane and features the Ting Tings in a desert ghost town. Double dutchers, cheerleaders, marching band drummers and sign spinners come out from the woods wearing black clothes with reflective material. The Ting Tings perform the song, while behind them the double dutchers skip rope, the cheerleaders cheer, the drummers drum, and the sign spinners spin signs featuring the names from the song's lyrics on them.

Reception

Critical
The single received favourable reviews from critics upon re-release, with the NME describing it as "no-flab electro-pop nugget", while Q magazine described it as "a snatch of Hey Mickey-style handclaps and a gobbily staccato vocal, stitched together to fashion a groove that's as instant and familiar". Digital Spy compared the single to a "well-shaken can of cola", and added "[the track is] brimming with sticky, yummy, fizzy goodness".

Commercial
In the United Kingdom, the single entered at the top of the UK Singles Chart on 18 May 2008 – for the week ending dated 24 May 2008 – ending Madonna and Justin Timberlake's four-week reign at the top with "4 Minutes". The following week, however, it slipped to number two after Rihanna's "Take a Bow" climbed to number one. In Ireland, it peaked at number two for five consecutive weeks.

In Australia, after slowly rising up the singles chart, it eventually peaked inside the top 10, and was certified Platinum in 2009. On the Australian Physical Singles Chart, it peaked at 20, and on the Australian Digital track chart at number eight. In the United States, "That's Not My Name" peaked at number 39 on the Billboard Hot 100, giving the band their first top 40 there. The song was certified Gold on 2 April 2009, selling over 500,000 copies.

Covers and usage in media
Dizzee Rascal performed a version of this song in the Live Lounge on BBC Radio 1, changing the chorus to: "They call me 'blood'/ They call me 'rude boy'/They call me oi/They call me mate/ ...They use the 'N-word' like it's a game/ That's not my name..." During the Pittsburgh Penguins' Stanley Cup run in 2009, Pittsburgh radio station WDVE did a spoof of the song titled "That Is My Name" about Penguins player Evgeni Malkin, in which a man sounding like Malkin sang about his multiple nicknames. The song was also parodied as "He's Got My Name" for Cartoon Network's Johnny Test. Additionally, the song was used in a parody music video by Norwegian comedy duo Ylvis on their talk show I kveld med YLVIS (Tonight with YLVIS), titled "Jeg Heter Finn" ("My Name Is Finn").

The instrumental of the track was used in a UK cinema advert for BBC Radio 1 during the summer of 2008. A remixed version of the song was also used as the music for the PINK segment of the 2008 Victoria's Secret Fashion Show (remixed by Cho Dongho). The song is also used in Slovenian mobile operator Mobitel's commercial for their subscription package, Itak Džabest.<ref>{{cite web |url=https://www.youtube.com/watch?v=AdI0M2nVQ2I  |archive-url=https://ghostarchive.org/varchive/youtube/20211221/AdI0M2nVQ2I |archive-date=21 December 2021 |url-status=live |title=Mobitel Itak Džabest commercial |via=YouTube |date=21 November 2008 |access-date=29 May 2009}}</ref> "That's Not My Name" was used in the trailer for the 2009 summer film Post Grad, and on the shows 90210 on The CW, Brothers & Sisters on ABC, Taking the Stage, and The City on MTV, as well as in the films Fired Up! (2009) and Horrible Bosses (2011), in which Charlie Day's character Dale sang it in a car while on cocaine. The song was featured in CSI: NY as track of the beginning of the episode "Point of No Return". The song was also used on the Skins series 3 episode "Katie and Emily". This song often appears in the E4 sitcom The Inbetweeners and appeared in The Inbetweeners Movie (official soundtrack). Furthermore, the song was featured in Suburgatory. American avant-garde and experimental band Xiu Xiu used lines from "That's Not My Name" in a cover of "Only Girl (In The World)" by Rihanna. The lines were altered to say "You call me Jamie, that's not my name."

The song was also used in commercials and advertisements for Despicable Me 2, Joe Fresh, The Lego Movie, Coca-Cola, and Amazon Alexa. It has also been used in the films La Famille Bélier, Gnome Alone, and Peter Rabbit 2: The Runaway. The Israeli TV series Ha-Yehudim Ba'im'' used the song as a basis for a satire regarding the Jewish law forbidding the pronunciation of the tetragrammaton, where God complains about calling him with various names that are not truly His. 

On 15 January 2022, the song first went viral on TikTok when it appeared on videos among famous pet accounts. Four days later, on the 19th, celebrities such as Alicia Silverstone and Drew Barrymore began to post videos using the song set to photos of their previous notable roles.

Chart performance

Weekly charts

Year-end charts

Certifications

Release history

References

2008 singles
2008 songs
Columbia Records singles
Music videos directed by Sophie Muller
Number-one singles in Scotland
Songs written by Jules De Martino
Songs written by Katie White
The Ting Tings songs
UK Singles Chart number-one singles